The Hottentot is a lost 1929 American pre-Code comedy film directed by Roy Del Ruth and starring Edward Everett Horton and Patsy Ruth Miller. It is based on the 1920 Broadway play The Hottentot by William Collier, Sr. and Victor Mapes.

A previous silent version was produced by Thomas H. Ince in 1922, starring Douglas MacLean.

Plot
Sam Harrington (Edward Everrett Horton) is a simple horse lover who is mistaken for a champion steeplechase jockey and prevailed upon by Peggy Fairfax (Patsy Ruth Miller) to take part in an upcoming race.

Cast
 Edward Everett Horton as Sam Harrington
 Patsy Ruth Miller as Peggy Fairfax
 Douglas Gerrard as Swift
 Edward Earle as Larry Crawford
 Stanley Taylor as Alec Fairfax
 Gladys Brockwell as Mrs. Chadwick
 Maude Turner Gordon as May Gilford
 Otto Hoffman as Perkins
 Edmund Breese as Ollie

References

External links

Newspaper advertisement

1929 films
1920s sports comedy films
American sports comedy films
American black-and-white films
1920s English-language films
American films based on plays
Films directed by Roy Del Ruth
American horse racing films
Lost American films
Warner Bros. films
1929 lost films
Lost sports comedy films
1929 comedy films
1920s American films